The Shadow on the Window is a 1957 American film noir crime film directed by William Asher and starring Philip Carey, Betty Garrett and John Drew Barrymore. The screenplay involves a boy (Jerry Mathers) who is traumatized after seeing his mother being terrorized by thugs.

Plot
Upon seeing his mother Linda terrorized by three thugs, young Petey (Jerry Mathers) is traumatized and wanders off. Truck drivers find him and the boy is taken to police headquarters, where he is recognized as the son of detective Tony Atlas (Philip Carey).

Petey is in shock and cannot even recognize his dad, much less explain what happened. Three young men - Joey (Gerald Sarracini), Gil (Corey Allen), and Jess (John Drew Barrymore) - are holding Linda Atlas hostage in the home of a man named Canfield (Watson Downs), for whom she had been working freelance as a stenographer.

In the course of robbery, Canfield has been killed and the three are now arguing incessantly about whether to also kill Linda; they think she is the only eyewitness and do not believe her when she tells them she has a son and is worried about where he has gone.

At one point, Canfield's niece and her husband come looking for him, because he had missed his regular dinner date at their home. When the couple sees Linda's car, they assume the man is entertaining a woman; they leave.

Gil slips away to retrieve a gun from his mother's and stepfather's apartment. Tony and the police, in the meantime, have had some investigative success and arrive at the apartment while Gil is there. The young man runs, exchanges gunfire with Tony and is ultimately killed. Tony finds Linda's wallet in Gil's pocket.

Eventually, the truckers are located and are able to provide an idea of the general vicinity where they found the boy. The police take Petey to this area and he recognizes a tractor; on the ground they find one of his toy cowboy guns. Tony's men surround the house and, when they enter, they find Canfield's body and discover that Joey, too, is dead. Jess had located a gun upstairs in the home and the two had struggled for it.  Jess holds Linda at gunpoint, but Tony manages to disarm him.

At the sight of his mother, Petey emerges from his state of shock.

Cast
 Philip Carey as Tony Atlas
 Betty Garrett as Linda Atlas
 John Drew Barrymore as Jess Reber
 Corey Allen as Gil Ramsey
 Gerald Sarracini as Joey Gomez
 Jerry Mathers as Petey Atlas
 Sam Gilman as Sgt. Paul Denke
 Rusty Lane as Capt. McQuade
 Ainslie Pryor as Dr. Hodges
 Paul Picerni as Bigelow
 William Leslie as Stuart
 Doreen Woodbury as Molly
 Ellie Kent as Girl

See also
 List of American films of 1957

References

External links
 
 
 
 

1957 films
1957 crime drama films
American crime thriller films
American black-and-white films
Columbia Pictures films
1950s English-language films
Film noir
Films scored by George Duning
Films directed by William Asher
American crime drama films
1950s American films